KBJI-LP (106.3 FM) was a radio station broadcasting a religious format. Licensed to Bemidji, Minnesota, United States, the station was owned by Bemidji Religious Education Broadcasting.

The station's license was surrendered to the Federal Communications Commission and cancelled on May 4, 2018.

References

External links
 

Radio stations in Minnesota
Low-power FM radio stations in Minnesota
Radio stations established in 2005
2005 establishments in Minnesota
Defunct radio stations in the United States
Radio stations disestablished in 2018
2018 disestablishments in Minnesota
Defunct religious radio stations in the United States
Defunct mass media in Minnesota